Qamaran wa Zaytouna (International title: Two Moons and an Olive) is a Syrian feature drama film by director Abdellatif Abdelhamid.

Awards
Muscat Film Festival - Best Director, 2001.

External links
 

2001 films
Syrian drama films
2000s Arabic-language films
Films directed by Abdellatif Abdelhamid